The Sichuan Provincial Library, also known as the Sichuan Library, is a Chengdu-based comprehensive provincial-level public library, located at Tianfu Square. It was formed on 20 October 1912, then named the Sichuan Province-established Library,  which is one of the earliest public libraries established in China.

History
Sichuan Provincial Library was prepared in the third year of Xuantong (1909) and opened for service in the first year of the Republic of China (1912).  It was officially named the Sichuan Provincial Library in 1952.

In June 2019, Sichuan Provincial Library established the Zhang Daqian Documentation Centre.

On 11 October 2020, the Long Scroll of 100 Pictures of Giant Pandas Thangka debuted at the Sichuan Provincial Library.

References

Libraries in China
Buildings and structures in Sichuan
Libraries established in 1912